Criticism of technology is an analysis of adverse impacts of industrial and digital technologies. It is argued that, in all advanced industrial societies (not necessarily only capitalist ones), technology becomes a means of domination, control, and exploitation, or more generally something which threatens the survival of humanity.  Some of the technology opposed by the most radical critics may include everyday household products, such as refrigerators, computers, and medication. However, criticism of technology comes in many shades.

Overview
Prominent authors elaborating a critique of technology include Donna J. Haraway, Jacques Ellul, Wendy Hui Kyong Chun, Joanna Bryson, Kate Crawford, Gilles Deleuze, Ted Kaczynski, Ivan Illich, Ritesh Kumar, Langdon Winner, Joseph Weizenbaum, Theodore Roszak, Günther Anders, Neil Postman, Martin Heidegger, Oswald Spengler, Pentti Linkola, Andrew Feenberg, Thorstein Veblen, David Skrbina, Mike Cooley, John Zerzan, Lewis Mumford, Derrick Jensen, and Layla AbdelRahim. Some authors such as Chellis Glendinning and Kirkpatrick Sale consider themselves Neo-Luddites and hold that technological progress has had a negative impact on humanity. Their work focused on seeking meaning out of technological change, specifically wrestling with the question of "how tools and their affordances change and alter the fabric of everyday life." Ellul, for instance, maintained that when people assert that technology is an instrument of freedom or the means to achieve historical destiny or the execution of divine vocation, it results in the glorification and sanctification of Technique so that it becomes that which gives meaning and value to life rather than mere ensemble of materials. This is echoed by rhetorical critics who cite the way technological discourse damages institutions and individuals who make up those institutions due to its idealization and capacity to define social hierarchies. 

In its most extreme, criticisms of technology produce analyses of technology as potentially leading to catastrophe. For instance, activist Naomi Klein described how technology is employed by capitalism in its commitment to a "shock doctrine", which promotes a series of crises so that speculative profit can be accumulated. There are theorists who also cite the cases of the global financial crises as well as the Chernobyl and Fukushima disasters to support their critique. Critiques also focus on specific issues such as how technology - through robotics, automation, and software - is destroying people's jobs faster than it is creating them, contributing to the incidence of poverty and inequality.

In the 1970s in the US, the critique of technology became the basis of a new political perspective called anarcho-primitivism, which was forwarded by thinkers such as Fredy Perlman, John Zerzan, and David Watson. They proposed differing theories about how it became an industrial society, and not capitalism as such, that was at the root of contemporary social problems. This theory was developed in the journal Fifth Estate in the 1970s and 1980s, and was influenced by the Frankfurt School, the Situationist International, Jacques Ellul and others.

The critique of technology overlaps with the philosophy of technology but whereas the latter tries to establish itself as an academic discipline the critique of technology is basically a political project, not limited to academia. It features prominently in neo-Marxist (Herbert Marcuse and Andrew Feenberg), ecofeminism (Vandana Shiva) and in post development (Ivan Illich)

See also
Critical theory
Deep ecology
Development criticism
Frankfurt School
Luddite
Medicalization
Paradigm shift
Science, technology and society
Social criticism
Social effect of evolutionary theory
Technology and society
 History of science and technology

Sources

Further reading
Wendy Hui Kyong Chun, Control and freedom (2006)
Donna J. Haraway, A Cyborg Manifesto (1985)
Gilles Deleuze, Postscript on the Societies of Control (1992)
Lewis Mumford, Technics and Civilization (1934)
Layla AbdelRahim, Children's Literature, Domestication, and Social Foundation: Narratives of Civilization and Wilderness, Routledge, 2018 paperback ; 2015 hardback 
Michael Adas, Machines as the Measure of Men: Science, Technology, and Ideologies of Western Dominance, Cornell University Press 1990
Braun, Ernest (2009). Futile Progress: Technology’s Empty Promise, Routledge. 
Jacques Ellul, The Technological Society, Trans. John Wilkinson. New York: Knopf, 1964. London: Jonathan Cape, 1965. Rev. ed.: New York: Knopf/Vintage, 1967. with introduction by Robert K. Merton (professor of sociology, Columbia University).
Jacques Ellul, The Technological Bluff, Trans. Geoffrey W. Bromiley. Grand Rapids: Eerdmans, 1990.
Andrew Feenberg, Transforming Technology. A Critical Theory Revisited, Oxford University Press, 2nd edition 2002,  - Feenberg offers a "coherent starting point for anticapitalist technical politics"  to overcome what he considers to be the "fatalism" of Ellul, Heidegger, and other proponents of "substantive" theories of technology.
Martin Heidegger, The Question Concerning Technology, and Other Essays, B&T 1982, 
Huesemann, Michael H., and Joyce A. Huesemann (2011). Technofix: Why Technology Won’t Save Us or the Environment, New Society Publishers, Gabriola Island, British Columbia, Canada, .
Derrick Jensen and George Draffan, Welcome to the Machine: Science, Surveillance, and the Culture of Control, Chelsea Green Publishing Company, 2004, 
Mander, Jerry (1992). In the Absence of the Sacred: The Failure of Technology and the Survival of the Indian Nations, Sierra Club Books. 
Postman, Neil (1993). Technopoly: The Surrender of Culture to Technology, Vintage.
David Watson, Against the Megamachine, Brooklyn: Autonomedia, 1998,  - The title essay is available online here
Joseph Weizenbaum, Computer Power and Human Reason: From Judgement to Calculation, W.H.Freeman & Co Ltd, New Edition 1976
Langdon Winner, Autonomous Technology: Technics-Out-Of-Control as a Theme in Political Thought, MIT Press 1977, 
Peter Zelchenko (1999). Exploring Alternatives to Hype. Educational Leadership 56(5), pp. 78-81.
Theodore John Kaczynski, Anti-Tech Revolution: Why and How, Fitch & Madison, 2016

External links

Collection of early anarcho-primitivist articles published in Fifth Estate
S. Ravi Rajan - Science, State and Violence: An Indian Critique Reconsidered
 Wikiversity:The limits of technological potential

Technology
Science and technology studies
Technology
Philosophy of technology
Technology systems